Croatia–Japan relations refers to the historic and current bilateral relationship between Croatia and Japan. The two countries established diplomatic relations with each other on March 5, 1993. The embassy of Croatia in Tokyo was founded in September 1993 while the Japanese embassy in Zagreb was founded in February 1998. Historically, both countries were part of the Axis powers during World War II, as Japan maintained an embassy in Zagreb and recognized the Independent State of Croatia, which was a puppet government of Nazi Germany.

Military ties 

Croatia officially joined NATO on April 1, 2009. Since the accession to the military alliance, Croatia and Japan share the same ally, the United States.

A training ship of the Japan Maritime Self-Defense Force (JMSDF) JDS Kashima visited to Split, the second-largest city in Croatia for celebrating 20th anniversary of diplomatic relations between both countries in September 2013. This is the first visit ever to Croatia by a Japanese naval vessel. A party for fellowship which includes joint performance by JMSDF Band and Croatian Navy Band was held aboard Kashima anchored in a port of Split, and Former Croatian President Stjepan Mesić, Japanese Ambassador Masaru Tsuji, JMSDF Rear Admiral Fumiyuki Kitagawa, dozens of militaries of both navies and general citizens were attended.

Sister cities 
  Rijeka –  Kawasaki (Since June 23, 1977)
  Zagreb –  Kyoto (Since October 22, 1981)
  Pula –  Hekinan (Since April 5, 2007)

See also 
 Foreign relations of Croatia 
 Foreign relations of Japan
 Japan–European Union relations
 Japan–Yugoslavia relations

References

External links 
 Embassy of the Republic of Croatia in Japan
 Embassy of Japan in Croatia , Embassy of Japan in Croatia 

 
Japan
Bilateral relations of Japan